The 2015 Copa América was an international football tournament held in Chile from 11 June to 4 July 2015. All twelve national teams involved in the tournament were required to register a squad of 22 players, or 23 players if the team chose to have three goalkeepers; only players in these squads were eligible to take part in the tournament. Each nation's squad of players were given shirt numbers 1–23.

Group A

Chile 
The final 23-player squad was announced on 30 May 2015. On 5 June 2015, midfielder Edson Puch was ruled out of the tournament due to muscle tear, being replaced by Francisco Silva. José Pedro Fuenzalida also replaced the injured Carlos Carmona on 7 June 2015.

Head coach:  Jorge Sampaoli

Mexico 
The final 23-player squad was announced on 11 May 2015. On 26 May 2015, defender Miguel Ángel Herrera sustained an ankle injury and was ruled out of the tournament, being replaced by Juan Carlos Valenzuela.

Head coach: Miguel Herrera

Ecuador 
The final 23-player squad was announced on 1 June 2015. On 1 June 2015, midfielder Michael Arroyo sustained an ankle injury and was ruled out of the tournament, being replaced by Pedro Larrea. On 3 June 2015, midfielder Antonio Valencia was ruled out of the tournament after undergoing urgent ankle surgery. On 11 June 2015, forward Jaime Ayoví was ruled out due to a muscle strain and was replaced by Daniel Angulo.

Head coach:  Gustavo Quinteros

Bolivia 
The final 23-player squad was announced on 1 June 2015.

Head coach: Mauricio Soria

Group B

Argentina 
The final 23-player squad was announced on 27 May 2015. The squad numbers were revealed on 7 June 2015.

Head coach: Gerardo Martino

Note: Mariano Andújar suffered an injured hand midway through the tournament, and Agustín Marchesín was called up to replace him on 22 June 2015. According to the regulations, once the competition starts, only the goalkeepers may be replaced due to injury.

Uruguay 
The final 23-player squad was announced on 23 May 2015. The squad numbers were revealed on 5 June 2015.

Head coach: Óscar Tabárez

Paraguay 
The final 23-player squad was announced on 28 May 2015.

Head coach:  Ramón Díaz

Jamaica 
Head coach:  Winfried Schäfer

Group C

Brazil 
The final 23-player squad was announced on 5 May 2015. On 24 May 2015, goalkeeper Diego Alves sustained a knee injury and was ruled out of the tournament, being replaced by goalkeeper Neto. On 29 May 2015, defender Marcelo sustained a back injury and was ruled out of the tournament, being replaced by defender Geferson. On 2 June 2015, midfielder Luiz Gustavo was ruled out of the tournament due to pending surgery to correct a meniscus injury, being replaced by midfielder Fred. On 11 June 2015, Danilo was withdrawn from the squad after picking up an injury in Brazil's friendly match against Mexico. He was replaced by Dani Alves.

Head coach: Dunga

Colombia 
The final 23-player squad was announced on 30 May 2015.

Head coach:  José Pékerman

Peru 
The final 23-player squad was announced on 25 May 2015. The squad numbers were revealed on 7 June 2015.

Head coach:  Ricardo Gareca

Venezuela 
The final 23-player squad was announced on 1 June 2015.

Head coach: Noel Sanvicente

References

2015 Copa América
2015